Peter Pacult (born 28 October 1959) is an Austrian former professional footballer and current football manager. He is in charge of Austria Klagenfurt.

Club career
A prolific striker, however not for the national team, Pacult started his career at Vienna side Floridsdorfer AC before turning professional with Wiener SC. He joined Austrian giants Rapid Wien four years later, losing the UEFA Cup Winners Cup Final in 1985 against Everton. He moved on to and won two league titles with FC Tirol Innsbruck, with whom he was the top goal scorer in the 1990–91 European Cup alongside Jean-Pierre Papin.

In 1993, he moved abroad to help TSV 1860 Munich win promotion to the Bundesliga. He finished his career at the other big Vienna club, Austria, in 1996.

International career
He made his debut for Austria in October 1982 against Northern Ireland but was not considered for the 1990 FIFA World Cup. He earned 24 caps, scoring one goal. His last international was a November 1993 World Cup qualification match against Sweden.

International goal
Scores and results list Austria's goal tally first.

Coaching career
Pacult was head coach of 1860 Munich II from April 2001 to June 2001, 1860 Munich from October 2001 to March 2003, FC Kärnten from January 2004 to June 2005, Dynamo Dresden from December 2005 to September 2006, Rapid Wien from September 2006 to April 2011, and RB Leipzig from July 2011 to July 2012. Pacult returned to Dynamo Dresden between December 2012 and August 2013. Both supporters and the club's board was dissatisfied with his performance during the last match; frustrated with recent results. He was hired to coach FAC Team für Wien on 22 April 2015.

In June 2017 he became the coach of Serbian SuperLiga side Radnički Niš.

In March 2019 he became the coach of Montenegrin First League side OFK Titograd.

Coaching record

Honours

Player

Club
Rapid Wien 
Austrian Cup: 1984–85

Swarovski Tirol 
Austrian Bundesliga: 1988–89, 1989–90
Austrian Cup: 1988–89

Individual
Performance
Austrian Bundesliga Top Scorer: 1988–89 (26 goals)
 European Cup top scorer: 1990–91

Manager
Rapid Wien
Austrian Bundesliga: 2007–08

References

External links
 Peter Pacult at rapidarchiv.at 
  Peter Pacult at austria-archiv.at 
 
 Peter Pacult at worldfootball.net 

1959 births
Living people
Footballers from Vienna
Austrian footballers
Austria international footballers
Association football forwards
SK Rapid Wien players
FC Swarovski Tirol players
TSV 1860 Munich players
FK Austria Wien players
Austrian expatriate footballers
Expatriate footballers in Germany
Austrian expatriate sportspeople in Germany
Austrian Football Bundesliga players
Bundesliga players
Austrian football managers
TSV 1860 Munich managers
FC Kärnten managers
Dynamo Dresden managers
Floridsdorfer AC managers
SK Rapid Wien managers
RB Leipzig managers
HNK Cibalia managers
FK Radnički Niš managers
FK Kukësi managers
OFK Titograd managers
Bundesliga managers
2. Bundesliga players
UEFA Champions League top scorers
Austrian expatriate football managers
Expatriate football managers in Serbia
Austrian expatriate sportspeople in Serbia
Expatriate football managers in Albania
Austrian expatriate sportspeople in Albania
Expatriate football managers in Croatia
Austrian expatriate sportspeople in Croatia
Expatriate football managers in Slovenia
Austrian expatriate sportspeople in Slovenia
Expatriate football managers in Montenegro
Austrian expatriate sportspeople in Montenegro
Floridsdorfer AC players